The Nemonite Invasion is an exclusive to audio Doctor Who story, produced as part of BBC Books' New Series Adventures line, and the third entry in the series to be produced. Read by Catherine Tate, it is the third non-televised Doctor Who adventure to feature the companion Donna Noble.  It was released on 12 February 2009.

Featuring 
 Tenth Doctor
 Donna Noble

References

Audiobooks based on Doctor Who
Tenth Doctor audio plays
2009 audio plays